Piotr Małachowski (born 7 June 1983) is a Polish retired discus thrower, two-time silver medalist at the 2008 Summer Olympics and 2016 Summer Olympics. His personal best throw is 71.84 metres, ranks him fifth in all-time longest discus throw distances, achieved on 8 June 2013 at Hengelo, the Netherlands.

Career
Małachowski's throwing distances are seen as even more remarkable as he is not as tall as most discus throwers. Małachowski is one inch shorter than Beijing Olympic champion Gerd Kanter and three inches shorter than world champion Robert Harting and discus great Virgillius Alekna. Despite his height disadvantage, Małachowski makes up for it with his incredible ring speed. Malachowski is seen as one of the quickest discus throwers in the ring of all time, closely followed by Róbert Fazekas.

On 19 August 2008, he won an Olympic silver medal in discus throw (67.82 m) placing behind Gerd Kanter (68.82 m). On 23 May 2009, in Halle he threw 68.75 m with a new PB and NR. On 14 July 2009, he was second in IAAF Golden League Berlin, Germany (67.70 m) to be only beaten by Gerd Kanter (67.88 m).

With an injured finger, Małachowski took a silver medal (69.15 m - NR) at 2009 World Championships in Berlin.

In 2010, he took victory in Golden Gala, IAAF Diamond League (68.78 m), beating second-placed Gerd Kanter (67.69 m), and another win in British Grand Prix (69.83 m - NR).

On 13 August 2016, Małachowski won his second Olympic silver (67.55 m), being surprisingly beaten by German Christoph Harting (68.37 m - PB).
He announced shortly afterwards that he would sell his Olympic silver medal to raise funds for a 3-year-old boy with a rare form of cancer. The medal was sold at an auction a few days later.

Achievements

For his sport achievements, he received:
 Golden Cross of Merit in 2008.
 Golden Medal for Merit for Country Defence in 2009.
 Knight's Cross of the Order of Polonia Restituta (5th Class) in 2009.

See also
Polish records in athletics

References

External links

 MALACHOWSKI rzutyiskoki.pl

1983 births
Living people
Polish male discus throwers
Olympic athletes of Poland
Athletes (track and field) at the 2008 Summer Olympics
Athletes (track and field) at the 2012 Summer Olympics
Athletes (track and field) at the 2016 Summer Olympics
Olympic silver medalists for Poland
People from Żuromin County
World Athletics Championships medalists
European Athletics Championships medalists
Medalists at the 2008 Summer Olympics
Sportspeople from Masovian Voivodeship
World Athletics Championships athletes for Poland
Medalists at the 2016 Summer Olympics
Olympic silver medalists in athletics (track and field)
Śląsk Wrocław athletes
Skra Warszawa athletes
Diamond League winners
Polish Athletics Championships winners
World Athletics Championships winners
Athletes (track and field) at the 2020 Summer Olympics
21st-century Polish people